Michael Maltzan is the principal architect at Michael Maltzan Architecture (MMA), a Los Angeles-based architecture firm. He received a Master of Architecture degree from Harvard University and both a Bachelor of Architecture degree and a Bachelor of Fine Arts degree from the Rhode Island School of Design. Maltzan was selected as a Fellow of the American Institute of Architects in 2007.

Early life and education 
Born outside of Levittown on Long Island, Maltzan grew as one of five children. His family moved often as Maltzan’s father, William, a medical supply salesman, searched for better-paying jobs. His mother Jacqueline stayed home to raise the children. He enrolled in his first drafting course in high school in Hebron, Connecticut. He first came to L.A. as part of a student research trip with Harvard Graduate School of Design in 1987.

Career 
Maltzan returned to L.A. was in 1988 to work in Frank O. Gehry’s office, on the design of Walt Disney Concert Hall. 

Maltzan founded Michael Maltzan Architecture, Inc. in 1995, with offices in Silver Lake, Los Angeles. His first solo project was the small, nonprofit Inner City Arts complex for children, completed in 1995 in the Downtown Los Angeles warehouse district. In 1996, entertainment lawyer Alan Hergott offered him his first major residential commission, a $2-million house in Beverly Hills on a site overlooking Los Angeles.

In 1998, Ann Philbin selected Maltzan to design a major renovation of the Hammer Museum in Westwood, Los Angeles. In 1999, curator Terence Riley included him in the Museum of Modern Art’s influential exhibition “The Un-Private House.”

In 2012, Michael Maltzan and engineering firm HNTB were selected through an international competition to design the Sixth Street Viaduct. The bridge will replace the original 1932 Sixth Street Viaduct that suffers from alkali-silica reaction which makes the bridge vulnerable to seismic failure. The bridge design is known as “The Ribbon of Light” and is the largest bridge project in the history of Los Angeles. The bridge opened to the public on July 9, 2022.

Recognition 
The practice has been recognized with five Progressive Architecture awards, 31 citations from the American Institute of Architects, the Rudy Bruner Award for Urban Excellence, and as a finalist for the Smithsonian/Cooper-Hewitt Museum's National Design Award. Maltzan was awarded the American Academy of Arts and Letters Award in Architecture in 2012 and the Society of Architectural Historians Change Agent Award in 2021. He received the 2016 AIA Los Angeles Gold Medal and was elected to the National Academy of Design in 2020. 

Maltzan currently serves on the Deans leadership council at the Harvard Graduate School of Design and the Visiting Committee to the GSD. He was featured in the Canadian Centre for Architecture’s 2019 film, What It Takes to Make a Home, delivered the 20th Annual John T. Dunlop Lecture for the Joint Center for Housing Studies of Harvard University, and his work was named One of the 25 Best Inventions of 2015 by Time Magazine.

Notable projects 
 New Vassar residence hall, MIT, Cambridge, MA (2021)
 Qaumajuq - Inuit Art Centre, Winnipeg, Canada (2020)
 Rice University Moody Center for the Arts, Houston, TX (2016)
 Crest Apartments, Los Angeles, CA (2016)
 One Santa Fe, Los Angeles, CA (2015)
 Hammer Museum John V. Tunney Bridge, Los Angeles, CA (2015)
 Art Center College of Design Master Plan, Pasadena, CA (2015)
 Star Apartments, Los Angeles, CA (2014)
 Playa Vista Park, Playa Vista, CA (2010)
 Pittman Dowell Residence, La Crescenta, CA (2009)
 New Carver Apartments, Los Angeles, CA (2009)
 Inner-City Arts, Los Angeles, CA (1995, 2005, 2008)
 Rainbow Apartments, Los Angeles, CA (2005)
 BookBar, Jinhua Architecture Park, Jinhua, China (2006)
 Billy Wilder Theater, Los Angeles, CA (2006)
 MOMA QNS, Long Island City, NY (2002)
 Hergott Shepard Residence, Beverly Hills, CA (1998)

Gallery

Personal life 
Maltzan has been married to fellow architect Amy Murphy since 1988.

References

Further reading
 Trajectory of Change AIA interview
 Other Space Odysseys: Greg Lynn, Michael Maltzan, Alessandro Poli (April 8, 2010 - September 19, 2010). Exhibition at the Canadian Centre for Architecture, featuring the work of architects Greg Lynn, Michael Maltzan, and Alessandro Poli, and curated by Giovanna Borasi and Mirko Zardini, CCA, with Greg Lynn, Michael Maltzan, and Alessandro Poli.
 Speed Limits (May 20 - November 8, 2009). Exhibition at the Canadian Centre for Architecture curated by Jeffrey Schnapp, Stanford Humanities Lab. Exhibition design by Michael Maltzan Architecture, Los Angeles.

Major publications 
 Social Transparency: Projects On Housing / Columbia Books on Architecture and the City, 2016; 
 Other Space Odysseys: Greg Lynn, Michael Maltzan, Alessandro Poli / edited by Giovanna Borasi, Mirko Zardini (2010, Canadian Centre for Architecture)

External links
 Michael Maltzan Architecture website

20th-century American architects
Harvard Graduate School of Design alumni
1959 births
Living people
Rhode Island School of Design alumni
21st-century American architects
People from Levittown, New York